Jon Ewbank Manchip White (22 June 1924 – July 31, 2013) was the Welsh American author of more than thirty books of non-fiction and fiction, including The Last Race, Nightclimber, Death By Dreaming, Solo Goya, and his final novel, Rawlins White: Patriot to Heaven, published in 2011. White was also the author of a number of plays, teleplays,  screenplays and volumes of short stories and poetry.

Biography
White was born in 1924 in Cardiff, Wales, to shipping company owner Gwilym Manchip White. When White was young his father contracted tuberculosis, and at the age of eight White was sent away to boarding school in England to reduce his risk of infection.

White did well enough in school to earn an Exhibition in English to St Catharine's College, Cambridge in 1941, and studied there until enrolling in the Royal Navy in 1943 to fight in World War II. After initially putting to sea helping to ferry men and supplies across the English Channel, White joined the Welsh Guards, where he served until the end of the war. On VE Day, White met his future wife, nurse Valerie Leighton. They have two daughters, Bronwen ( Bronwen White) and Rhiannon (Rhiannon White Kirkpatrick) whom they named for characters in The Mabinogion, the  book of Welsh mythology.

White returned to Cambridge after his military service, and in 1950 he graduated with an Honours degree in English, prehistoric archaeology, and oriental languages, receiving a diploma in anthropology. White's Egyptology studies earned him an offer to work for the Keeper of the Egyptian and Assyrian Department at the British Museum, but he opted instead to become a story editor for the newly created BBC Television Service, where he read scripts and worked on episodes of his own, including serial adaptations of Elizabeth Gaskell's Cranford and his own Witch Hunt, famous - or notorious - for depicting the first, if brief, scene of a group of men and women, all naked, engaged in sexual congress.

After a brief stint in the British Foreign Service, White went back to writing for television and film, including five years spent travelling and living in places such as Madrid and Paris, as a script doctor with Samuel Bronston Productions. There amongst other Bronston productions, he made contributions to such epic films as El Cid and 55 Days at Peking. He was also a script doctor on the science fiction film The Day of the Triffids. Later he finished his movie career as Walt Disney's European story editor, based in Berlin. By 1962, White was back to writing for television, including writing an episode of The Avengers (Series 2 episode).

Throughout his film and television career, White was a prolific writer of novels and nonfiction, including books on travel, art and anthropology. In 1967 White left screenwriting and the UK behind to move to the United States and become writer-in-residence at the University of Texas at El Paso, where he began the school's creative writing department and eventually became a full professor. Ten years later White was hired by the Department of English at the University of Tennessee at Knoxville, where he became the Lindsay Young Professor of English and founded another creative writing department. He was Professor Emeritus at the University of Tennessee, Phi Beta Kappa, a member of the Texas Institute of Letters and of the Welsh Academy.

Selected filmography
 Mask of Dust (1954) (adapted from his novel The Last Race; released in the US as Race for Life)
 A Day of Grace (1956)
 The Camp on Blood Island (1958)
 Mystery Submarine (1963) (aka Decoy)
 Crack in the World (1965)
 Naked Evil (1966) (aka Exorcism at Midnight in the US; based on his teleplay The Obi)

Bibliography

Fiction
 The Last Race • London (Hodder & Stoughton, 1953) New York (Mill, 1953) Also: made into the feature film Mask of Dust, which White co-wrote)
 Build Us A Dam • London (Hodder & Stoughton, 1955) Also: Corgi Books
 The Girl from Indiana • London (Hodder & Stoughton, 1956)
 No Home but Heaven • London (Hodder & Stoughton, 1957)
 The Mercenaries • London (Long, 1958) Also: Arrow Books and Major Books
 Hour of the Rat • London (Hutchinson, 1962) Also: Digit Books
 The Rose in the Brandy Glass • London (Eyre & Spottiswoode, 1965)
 Nightclimber • London (Chatto & Windus, 1968) New York (Morrow, 1968) Also: Sphere Books and Ace Books
 The Game of Troy • London (Chatto & Windus, 1971) New York (McKay, 1971), Also: Dell Books
 The Garden Game • London (Hodder & Stoughton, 1973) Indianapolis (Bobbe Merrill, 1974) Also: Pinnacle Books
 Send for Mr. Robinson • New York (Pinnacle, 1974) London (Panther, 1974)
 The Moscow Papers • Canoga Park, CA (Major Books, 1979)
 Death by Dreaming • Cambridge, MA (Apple-Wood Books, 1981)
 Fevers and Chills • Woodstock, VT (Foul Play Press, 1983 - Omnibus edition, featuring Nightclimber, The Game of Troy, and The Garden Game.
 The Last Grand Master • Woodstock, VT (Countryman Press, 1985)
 Whistling Past the Churchyard • New York (Atlantic Monthly Press, 1992 - collection of short stories)
 Echoes and Shadows • UK (Tartarus Press, 2003 - collection of short stories)
 Solo Goya • Oak Ridge, TN (Iris Press, 2007)
 Rawlins White: Patriot To Heaven • Oak Ridge, TN (Iris Press, 2011)
 The Bird with Silver Wings • (Iris Press, 2012 - a collection of musically themed short stories)

Nonfiction
 Ancient Egypt • London (Allen Wingate, 1952), New York (Crowell, 1953) London (Allen & Unwin, 1970)
 Anthropology • London (English Universities Press, 1954), New York (Philosophical Library, 1954)
 Marshal of France: The Life and times of Maurice, Comte de Saxe • London (Hamish Hamilton, 1962) Chicago (Rand McNally, 1962)
 Everyday Life in Ancient Egypt • London (Batsford, 1964) New York (Putman, 1965; Peter Bedrick, 1991, Also: Capricorn Books)
 Diego Velázques, Painter and Courtier • London (Hamish Hamilton, 1969) Chicago (Rand McNally, 1969)
 The Land God Made in Anger: Reflections on a Journey through South West Africa • London (Allen & Unwin, 1969) Chicago (Rand McNally, 1969)
 Cortés and the Downfall of the Aztec Empire • London (Hamish Hamilton, 1971) New York (St. Martin's Press, 1971; Carroll & Graf, 1989)
 A World Elsewhere: One Man’s Fascination with the American Southwest • New York (Crowell, 1975) London (as The Great American Desert - Allen & Unwin, 1976) Texas (Texas A&M Press, 1988)
 Everyday Life of the North American Indians • London (Batsford, 1979) New York (Holmes & Meier, 1979; Dorset Press, 1989)
 What to Do When the Russians Come: A Survivors’ Handbook (with Robert Conquest)• New York (Stein & Day, 1984)
 The Journeying Boy: Scenes from a Welsh Childhood • New York (Atlantic Monthly Press, 1991)

As editor
 Life in Ancient Egypt by Adolf Erman •  New York (Dover, 1970)
 The Tomb of Tutankhamun by Howard Carter • New York (Dover, 1972)
 Manners and Customs of the Modern Egyptians by E. W. Lane • New York (Dover, 1973)
 Egypt & The Holy Land: Historic Photographs by Francis Frith (with Julia van Haaften) • New York (Dover, 1981) London (Constable, 1982)
 A History of the Ancient Egyptians by James Henry Breasted • New York (Peter Bedrick, 1991)
 Introduction to Old Calabria by Norman Douglas • Vermont (Marlboro Books, 1993)
 Introduction to Travels with a Donkey in the Cévennes by Robert Louis Stevenson • Illinois (Marlboro/Northwestern, 1996)

Poetry collections
 Dragon and Other Poems • London (Fortune Press, 1943)
 Salamander and Other Poems • London (Fortune Press, 1945)
 The Rout of San Romano • Aldington, Kent (Hand & Flower Press, 1952)
 The Mountain Lion • London (Chatto & Windus, 1971) in the Phoenix Living Poets series

Original Movies, Television and Radio Plays
Avengers
Camp on Blood Island
Chariot of Fire
The Circuit
The Colonel
Concerto for the Left Hand
Counsel for the Queen
Crack in the World
Day of Grace
Hour of the Rat
Decoy
Man with a Dog
Mask of Dust
Musk of Amber
Mystery Submarine
The Obi
A Question of Honour
The Rose in the Brandy Glass
Second Fiddle
Souvenir
Victorian House
Who Killed Menna Lorraine?
Witch Hunt
Wolf Pack

Television and Radio Adaptations
Ace High (Peter Fleming)
The Collection (Stefan Zweig)
Cranford (Mrs. Gaskell)
Journey to the Center of the Earth (Jules Verne)
The Family Honour (Laurence Housman)
Journey into Fear (Eric Ambler)
Mrs. Dane's Defence (Henry Arthur Jones)
Paolo and Francesca (Stephen Phillips)
The Pistol Shot (Pushkin)
The Reverberator (Henry James)
The Wages of Fear (Georges Arnaud)
The War of the Worlds (H.G. Wells)
Witness for the Prosecution (Agatha Christie)

Compensated Contributor
El Cid
Fall of the Roman Empire
55 Days at Peking
Day of the Triffids
The Thin Red Line
Steel Bayonet
Ten Seconds to Hell
Frankenstein and Sherlock Holmes Films

Biographical Entries
Contemporary Authors Autobiography Series • Contemporary Novelists • Dictionary of International Biography • International Authors' Who's Who • Who's Who in America • Who's Who in the West and Southwest • Personalities of the South • Outstanding Educators of America • Twentieth Century Crime and Mystery Writers • The Writers Directory

References

External links
 Extended biography, including link to bibliography, at irisbooks.com
 
 Jon Manchip White Filmography at Fandango.com
 Inventory of the Jon Manchip White Collection at Texas A&M, including the original screenplay of Crack in the World

1924 births
2013 deaths
Alumni of St Catharine's College, Cambridge
20th-century American novelists
21st-century American novelists
American male novelists
American male screenwriters
Writers from Cardiff
20th-century Welsh novelists
Welsh emigrants to the United States
University of Texas at El Paso faculty
University of Tennessee faculty
Welsh screenwriters
20th-century American male writers
21st-century American male writers
Novelists from Texas
Novelists from Tennessee
Screenwriters from Texas
Screenwriters from Tennessee